Shweta Mohan is an Indian playback singer. She has received four Filmfare Awards South for Best Female Playback Singer, one Kerala State Film Awards and one Tamil Nadu State Film Awards. She has recorded songs for film music and albums in all the four South Indian languages namely, Malayalam, Tamil, Telugu, Kannada along with the Hindi language and has established herself as a leading playback singer of South Indian cinema. Some of her inspirations are Sujatha Mohan (her mother), Lata Mangeshkar and K.S. Chitra

Film songs

Non-film songs

2015

2017

2018

References

External links 
 Shweta Mohan Bollywood songs on Raaga

Hindi